The 2020 VTV Awards (Vietnamese: Ấn tượng VTV 2020 - Dấu ấn 50 năm) is a ceremony honouring the outstanding achievement in television on the Vietnam Television (VTV) network from August 2019 to July 2020. Different from previous years, Voting Round 2 was opened 3 days after Round 1 closed. This year, the ceremony is also an occasion to celebrate 50 years of VTV. It took place on September 5, 2020 in Hanoi and hosted by Thành Trung, Phí Linh & Trần Ngọc.

For the first time, there are two versions of the ceremony to be aired: TV version on VTV1 channel and digital/backstage version on VTV Go mobile app.

Winners and nominees
(Winners denoted in bold)

Presenters/Awarders

Special performances

References

External links

List of television programmes broadcast by Vietnam Television (VTV)

2020 television awards
VTV Awards
2020 in Vietnamese television
September 2020 events in Vietnam